Renewable Energy is a monthly peer-reviewed scientific journal covering research on renewable energy, sustainable energy and the energy transition. It is published by Elsevier and the editor-in-chief is Soteris Kalogirou (Cyprus University of Technology). According to the Journal Citation Reports, the journal has a 2021 impact factor of 8.634. It was originally established as Solar & Wind Technology in 1984, acquiring its current name in 1991.

References

External links 
 

Elsevier academic journals
Publications established in 1984
English-language journals
Energy and fuel journals
Monthly journals
Journal